Cameron High School is a public high school in Cameron, West Virginia, United States.  It is one of two high schools in the Marshall County School District. Athletic teams compete as the Cameron Dragons in the West Virginia Secondary School Activities Commission as a member of the Ohio Valley Athletic Conference.

References

External links
 Cameron High School official webpage

Public high schools in West Virginia
Education in Marshall County, West Virginia